The Whakaikai River is a short river of the West Coast Region of New Zealand's South Island. It flows generally northwest to reach the Tasman Sea five kilometres to the northwest of the mouth of the Wanganui River.

See also
List of rivers of New Zealand

References

Rivers of the West Coast, New Zealand
Rivers of New Zealand
Westland District